Jonathan Ngarimu Mane-Wheoki  (8 December 1943 – 10 October 2014) was a New Zealand art historian, academic, and curator. Of Ngāpuhi, Te Aupōuri, Ngāti Kurī and English descent, he was a pioneer in the study of contemporary Māori and Pacific art history.

Biography
Born on 18 December 1943, Mane-Wheoki grew up in the Hokianga. When his family moved to Titirangi in the 1950s, he came into contact with the prominent New Zealand artist, Colin McCahon, who would become his first art teacher at night classes taught at the Auckland Art Gallery by McCahon in the 1950s. He later studied at the University of Canterbury, where Rudolf Gopas was an important influence on him, and at the Courtauld Institute of Art in London, gaining a Bachelor of Arts, Diploma of Fine Arts (with honours in painting) and a Master of Arts. His 1969 Master of Arts thesis was titled The musical phase of modern painting.

He began his academic career at the University of Canterbury in 1975, rising to become dean of music and fine arts. In 2004 he became director of art and collection services at the Museum of New Zealand Te Papa Tongarewa, and in 2009 he was appointed professor of fine arts and head of the Elam School of Fine Arts at the University of Auckland. He stepped down as the head of Elam in 2012, was an honorary research fellow at Te Papa from 2012, and in 2013 he took on the part-time role of head of arts and visual culture at that institution. After the 2011 Christchurch earthquake, he supported the retention of ChristChurch Cathedral, arguing that the church was part of the city's identity and its "heart".

Mane-Wheoki, who was an openly gay Anglican churchman, was seen as a positive role model in the LGBT community in New Zealand. Professor Geremy Hema stated, "for gay Maori and gay Anglicans his mere presence provides much inspiration. He was respected, adored and revered by all in the Maori, academic, ecclesiastical, and creative circles in which he and his partner Paul existed."

Honours
In 2008, Mane-Wheoki was awarded an honorary LittD by the University of Canterbury. He received the Pou Aronui Award from the Royal Society of New Zealand in 2012, for outstanding contribution in the development of the humanities in Aotearoa New Zealand. In the 2014 Queen's Birthday Honours he was appointed a Companion of the New Zealand Order of Merit, for services to the arts.

Death
He died in Auckland on 10 October 2014 after a long struggle with pancreatic cancer, having recently visited the Hokianga to see where he would be buried, and said he was prepared to die. "I am relaxed about it, what else can I be?" He died a month after his investiture ceremony at Government House as a Companion of the New Zealand Order of Merit.

References

1943 births
2014 deaths
Alumni of the Courtauld Institute of Art
Companions of the New Zealand Order of Merit
Deaths from cancer in New Zealand
Deaths from pancreatic cancer
Ngāpuhi people
Te Aupōuri people
Ngāti Kurī people
New Zealand art historians
People associated with the Museum of New Zealand Te Papa Tongarewa
People from the Hokianga
University of Canterbury alumni
Academic staff of the University of Canterbury
Academic staff of the University of Auckland
New Zealand gay men
New Zealand Māori academics
New Zealand Anglicans